Birgitt Austermühl (also spelled Austermuehl, born 8 October 1965) is a German former football defender. She was part of the Germany women's national football team.

She competed at the 1996 Summer Olympics, playing 3 matches. On club level she played for FSV Frankfurt.

See also
 Germany at the 1996 Summer Olympics

References

External links
 
 
 
 
 
 Birgitt Austermühl at Sport.de 
 Birgitt Austermühl at Munzinger.de 
 
 Birgitt Austermühl at Soccerpunter.com
 

1965 births
Living people
German women's footballers
Place of birth missing (living people)
Footballers at the 1996 Summer Olympics
Women's association football defenders
1991 FIFA Women's World Cup players
Germany women's international footballers
Olympic footballers of Germany
1995 FIFA Women's World Cup players
UEFA Women's Championship-winning players